The Geneva Environment Network (GEN) is a cooperative partnership of over 75 environment and sustainable development organizations based in the Geneva area, including United Nations offices and programmes, local authorities, academic institutions and non-governmental organizations.

Set up in 1999 with the support of the Swiss Federal Office for the Environment, and under the coordination of UNEP Regional Office for Europe (ROE), the GEN Secretariat is based in the International Environment House (IEH), which gathers under a common roof a range of United Nations and non-governmental organizations active in the field of environment and sustainable development. GEN actively promotes increased cooperation and networking between its members by organizing and hosting meetings on the environment and sustainable development, such as roundtables and international workshops. During the past ten years, GEN has provided a welcome centre, a single access point to environmental information and knowledge to its members and public at large, and conference services.

The network members contribute actively to the GEN by sharing information and material, co-organizing and attending events.

External links 
 www.genevaenvironmentnetwork.org

Organisations based in Geneva
International environmental organizations